Roman Stanislavovich Adamov (born 21 June 1982) is a retired Russian football player.

Career

Club career 
Adamov has been prolific in the Russian Premier League since joining FC Moscow, he was signed from Terek Grozny.

In 2007, he and Roman Pavlyuchenko were top scorers in the Russian Premier League. In June 2008, he signed with FC Rubin Kazan, he won the Russian Premier League 2008 and was loaned out on 28 July 2009 to Krylya Sovetov Samara.

International career 
Adamov made his debut in Russia national football team on 26 March 2008 in a friendly against Romania.

Euro 2008 
In Euro 2008, he came on as a substitute in the 70th minute of the opening match of the campaign, a 4–1 defeat to future champions Spain.

Career honours

Club 
Terek Grozny
Russian First Division (1): 2004
Rubin Kazan
Russian Premier League (1): 2008

International 
Russia
UEFA European Championship Semi-finalist (1): 2008

Individual 
Russia Premier League top goalscorer (1): 2007*

(* Jointly shared with Roman Pavlyuchenko)

External links 

 
 FC Moscow profile
 FC Rubin profile
 Player profile

References

1982 births
Living people
People from Belaya Kalitva
Russian footballers
Russia youth international footballers
Russia under-21 international footballers
Russia international footballers
Russian expatriate footballers
Expatriate footballers in Ukraine
Russian expatriate sportspeople in Ukraine
Expatriate footballers in the Czech Republic
Russian expatriate sportspeople in the Czech Republic
Association football forwards
FC Olimpia Volgograd players
FC Rostov players
FC Akhmat Grozny players
FC Moscow players
FC Rubin Kazan players
PFC Krylia Sovetov Samara players
FC Sibir Novosibirsk players
FC Viktoria Plzeň players
Russian Premier League players
Czech First League players
UEFA Euro 2008 players
Sportspeople from Rostov Oblast